Montana has a wide variety of invasive aquatic species ranging from algae to turtles. The effect each invasive species has on the environment varies greatly, some species are devastating while others are negligible. Aquatic plants and algae may easily be transported from lake to lake by boaters who do not take the necessary precautions when launching their boats into new bodies of water. Sometimes pet owners may release their pets into a non native habitat where they will actually thrive and eventually establish a population and then begin to displace the native species that it competes with.

Algae

Amphibians

Fish

Aquatic Mammals

Mollusks

Aquatic Plants

Reptiles

Crustaceans

References 

Montana
Invasive species in North America